The 1944–45 NCAA men's basketball season began in December 1944, progressed through the regular season and conference tournaments, and concluded with the 1945 NCAA basketball tournament championship game on March 27, 1945, at Madison Square Garden in New York, New York. The Oklahoma A&M Aggies won their first NCAA national championship with a 49–45 victory over the NYU Violets.

Rule changes 

 Defensive goaltending was prohibited.
 A player fouls out after committing five fouls, including fouls committed in overtime. Previously, a player fouled out after committing four fouls in regulation or a fifth foul in overtime.
 Unlimited substitution is permitted for the first time. Previously, a player could re-enter a game only twice.
 No offensive player may stand in the free-throw lane (also known as the "key") for more than three seconds.

Season headlines
More than 18,000 fans attended the final installment of an annual American Red Cross benefit game between the NCAA Tournament and NIT champions at Madison Square Garden. Oklahoma A&M, led by Bob Kurland, defeated George Mikan's DePaul 52–44. Kurland scored 14 points while Mikan scored 9 before fouling out in only 14 minutes of playing time.
 In 1995, the Premo-Porretta Power Poll retroactively selected Iowa as its national champion for the 1944–45 season.

Major rule changes
Beginning in 1944–45, the following rules changes were implemented:
Along with the ball on the rim, defensive interference by touching the ball after it had started its downward flight during an opponent's field goal attempt was declared a goal for the shooting team.
Five personal fouls disqualify a player.  An extra foul was not permitted in overtime games.
Unlimited substitution was permitted.
It became a violation for an offensive player to remain in the free-throw lane for more than three seconds.

Premo-Porretta Power Poll
In 1995, the Premo-Porretta Power Poll retroactively ranked teams during the 1944–45 as follows by reviewing results, opponents, and margins of victory.

Conference membership changes

Regular season

Conference winners and tournaments

Conference standings

Statistical leaders
Scoring leader – George Mikan averaged 23.3 points per game and was retroactively declared the "unofficial" season scoring leader. Between 1935–36 and 1946–47, there were no official NCAA scoring champions. The statistics during that era were compiled from the National Basketball Committee Official Basketball Guide, which was not regulated by NCAA authorities. Therefore, those players are included in the annual NCAA men's basketball media guide, but are listed as unofficial season scoring leaders. No other personal statistics were tracked during the 1944–45 basketball season.

Post-season tournaments

NCAA tournament

Semifinals & finals

National Invitation tournament

Semifinals & finals 

 Third Place – St. John's 64, Rhode Island State 57

Award winners

Consensus All-American teams

Major player of the year awards
Helms Foundation Player of the Year: George Mikan, DePaul
Sporting News Player of the Year: George Mikan, DePaul

Other major awards
NIT/Haggerty Award (Top player in NYC area): Bill Kotsores, St. John's

Coaching changes 

A number of teams changed coaches during the season and after it ended.

References